This article describes the qualifying of the 2016–17 EHF Champions League.

Draw
The draw was held on 29 June 2016 at 13:00 in Vienna, Austria. The eight teams were split in two groups and played a semifinal and final to determine the last participants. Matches were played on 3 and 4 September 2016.

Seedings
The seedings were announced on 27 June 2016.

Qualification tournament 1
Tatran Prešov organized the tournament.

Bracket

Semifinals

Third place game

Final

Qualification tournament 2
Bregenz Handball organized the tournament.

Bracket

Semifinals

Third place game

Final

References

External links
Official website

Qualifying